Zeeshan Ansari (born 16 December 1999) is an Indian cricketer. He made his first-class debut for Uttar Pradesh in the 2017–18 Ranji Trophy on 6 October 2017. Prior to his first class debut, he was part of India's squad for the 2016 Under-19 Cricket World Cup. He made his Twenty20 debut for Uttar Pradesh in the 2018–19 Syed Mushtaq Ali Trophy on 28 February 2019.

References

External links
 

1999 births
Living people
Indian cricketers
Uttar Pradesh cricketers